Craigmore is a large suburb north of Adelaide, South Australia. It is in the City of Playford local government area, just east of Elizabeth and south of Gawler.

History 
Craigmore is within the traditional territory of the Aboriginal Kaurna people of the Adelaide Plains. European settlement in the area began in early 1850s and the wider district was known as Smithfield based upon the Township established by John Smith. Blair Farm was established by Gavin Scoular on land north of what is now Uley Road and East of Adams Road. Through a series of land purchases from 1853 to 1867 Scoular had built up his land holding to a total of 577 acres. Thomas Hogarth who was a member of South Australian Legislative Council from 1866 until his retirement in 1885 established a property in 1850 called Blair Place on land south of and adjacent to Smith's Creek and east of what is now known as Adams Road. Many of the early settlers of the Smithfield District had emigrated from Scotland. The meaning in Scottish for "Craig" is "rocky hill" and "More" is "big".

The modern development of Craigmore started circa 1970s with the construction of State Housing Trust estates. During 1975, the southeastern part of what is now Craigmore was built as a private development named Blair Park. Further private developments occurred during the mid-1980s, late 1990s, and throughout 2000, with urban infill still incomplete. This development has made Craigmore one of Adelaide's longest suburbs by distance, totalling 3.75 kilometres parallel with Adams Road between Kakuna Crescent and Arthur Street.

Geography 
Craigmore is situated on foothills approximately 29 km by road from the Adelaide GPO. Although Craigmore is a suburb of Adelaide and part of the Adelaide metropolitan area, Craigmore is 11 km from Gawler by road. Most dwellings are built up to the start of the hills (One Tree Hill), which are used for cattle grazing and wine growing.

Adams Creek runs through the middle of Craigmore, with an elevation of the suburb ranging from 86 to 149 meters at its highest point.

Demographics 
The 2006 census shows Craigmore as having a population of 10,319. Residents of Craigmore have a mixed income, with older former public housing residents in the middle and newer larger, more expensive houses in the newer estates such as Somerset Grove and Beckham Rise.

Community 
The local newspaper is the News Review Messenger. Other regional and national newspapers such as The Advertiser and The Bunyip are also available.

Facilities 
Craigmore is serviced by a high school which opened in 1970. Craigmore is also serviced by a shopping centre containing a Coles Supermarket, a liquor store BWS, an award-winning bakery and many other speciality shops. There is a YMCA, a number of public primary schools, Catherine McCauley School, and an R-12 Christian College (Hope Christian College). Close by, the large Munno Para Shopping City has many large stores including K-Mart, Foodland, and Harvey Norman. as well as the even bigger Elizabeth shopping centre. A new Woolworths shopping centre is also located in the adjacent Blakes Crossing.  Uleybury Winery and restaurant is a short 3 km walk from Craigmore. Some sporting clubs that reside in the area are Craigmore Cricket Club and the Munno Para City Soccer Club.

In June 2010, Craigmore was finally given television reception through the erection of a tower on the corner of Uley and Adams Roads in Elizabeth Park. In the same month, Craigmore was also given ADSL equivalent speed internet through wireless WiMAX. Prior to this date, one-half of the dwellings in Craigmore were within an ADSL blackspot and were required to rely on 3G, dialup, or satellite internet.

Parks 
Craigmore Park runs through the centre of the suburb. The linear park known as the Elephant Walk can be followed to Anderson Walk in Smithfield. As Craigmore borders the Adelaide Hills, there are lookout points on Craigmore Road and Uley Road, where the York Peninsula can sometimes be seen on a clear day.

Schools 
 Catherine McCauley Primary School
 Craigmore South Primary School
 Craigmore High School
 Hope Christian College
 Playford Primary School

Churches 
 Craigmore Christian Church
 Craigmore Latter Day Saints Chapel

Transport 
The area of Craigmore is serviced by Adelaide Metro which provides the 441, 442 and 443 services. All three services terminate at the Smithfield and Elizabeth Interchanges, with train connections to Adelaide and Gawler. The 443 service covers most of the area serviced by the 440, 441 and 442 bus services which only run as night services.

Notable people 
David Hicks; former Guantánamo Bay detainee.

See also 

 City of Playford
 List of Adelaide suburbs

References 

Suburbs of Adelaide